Dick White (18 August 1931 – 15 June 2002) was a professional footballer from 1950 to 1964. He played for the following clubs: Liverpool FC, Scunthorpe Sports Club (amateur), Brumby amateurs, Scunthorpe, Doncaster, Kettering Town (amateur).

External links
Player profile at LFChistory.net

References

1931 births
2002 deaths
Sportspeople from Scunthorpe
English footballers
Scunthorpe United F.C. players
Liverpool F.C. players
Doncaster Rovers F.C. players
Kettering Town F.C. players
Association football defenders
Kettering Town F.C. managers
English football managers